"Smack in the Middle" is a first-season episode of Batman. It first aired on ABC TV Thursday January 13, 1966. It is the conclusion of the two-part series pilot, the first being titled "Hi Diddle Riddle", which aired on the previous Wednesday night January 12.

Synopsis
Picking up from the previous night's episode in the Batcave, Batman's attempts to contact Robin are met with futility; alerted by Alfred Pennyworth about Aunt Harriet's having a fit on noticing their beds weren't slept in, Batman tells him to put her at ease by saying they're spending the night at his uncle's house. Meanwhile, the Riddler's "operation" on Robin involved only the making of a plastic surgery cast from Robin's masked face, used to make a perfect "Robin" disguise for Molly. After enticing Batman with a couple of clues, Riddler and Molly (as Robin) lead Batman on a chase outside the abandoned turtle mill at Orleans Cove before their Rolls-Royce is damaged by the Batray. The Riddler makes his escape as Molly tricks Batman into taking her into the Batcave. However, on the way, Batman spots the defect in the mask caused by the straws they gave Robin through which to breathe and discreetly disables Molly's gun. An unmasked Molly, after making an unsuccessful attempt to shoot Batman, tries to escape; Batman chases her to the top of the atomic pile (used to power the Batmobile), where she lets go of Batman's hand and falls to her death.

Batman rescues the true Robin and tells him that Molly is dead, but the Riddler manages to escape to the Moldavian Pavilion, where a gathering will honor the famous Mammoth of Moldavia, which is stuffed with used, yet priceless Moldavian postage stamps. The Riddler plans to steal the mammoth, and so he drenches the pavilion with nitrous oxide, dresses in a green and pink tuxedo costume and elephant mask which conceals his gas mask, and entertains the guests with a few jokes until everyone has fallen unconscious from laughter. The Riddler and the Mole Hill mob blast a hole through the floor and make ready to steal the priceless pachyderm when Batman and Robin leap out from inside the elephant and subdue the mob, whilst The Riddler runs for the man hole and leaps into it. Batman leaps after him, and Riddler shoots at him, misses, and hits a tank of noxious oxide causing it to explode, but not before Batman takes cover. The Riddler's body isn't recovered, so it's assumable he will live to plague Gotham City another day, but not if Batman and Robin can help it.

Notes
 The episode begins with a re-cap of the previous episode leading up to the cliffhanger. Here, still shots of the action are used, as also is the case in episode four. From episode six, the re-cap sequence consists of moving clips from the previous episode ended by freeze frame, occasionally featuring a different camera angle or a few seconds' extra footage cut from the night before.
 William Dozier originally auditioned people to narrate the series, but when none of them seemed to fit, he decided to do it himself.
 For the first two seasons, a tag preview of next week's villain followed every Part 2 episode, except the pilot.
 This is the first instance in the TV series of a villain escaping apprehension. The only other main villain to escape apprehension was Catwoman—twice — once by falling down a bottomless cavern and once by falling off a warehouse roof into a river.
 The series reveals that Bruce Wayne has an uncle who is never named. In the comics, Bruce's uncle Philip Wayne raised him after his parents' murders.
 The exterior shots of Wayne Manor were actually footage of 380 South San Rafael Avenue, Pasadena, CA.
 The "Moldavian Pavilion" in this episode and the preceding one ("Hi Diddle Riddle") was actually the Thailand Pavilion at the New York World's Fair. In reality, Thailand is a Southeast Asian Kingdom and not a European Republic, but elephants (albeit not mammoths) do play a significant role in Thai culture. 
 The original script had a grimmer Batman, who "allowed" Molly to fall to her death. DC Comics rejected the scene and it was shot with Batman desperately trying to save Molly.
 In future episodes, it is explained that everybody who is taken back to the Batcave must be given the "bat-gas" sedative so as not to spy the Batcave's location and deduce Batman's identity. Yet, in this episode, although Batman guesses Riddler's moll has disguised herself as Robin, he takes her back to the Batcave without bat-gas. Even though she must have seen the Batcave's entrance underneath Wayne Manor, she makes no reference to this in the subsequent scene.
 The scene of the Batmobile leaving the Batcave to race the remaining 14 miles to Gotham was filmed at Bronson Cavern in Hollywood Hills. This cave was used in many horror films including Invasion of the Body Snatchers (Allied Artists, 1956). The problem they ran into when filming the scene was that The Batmobile was just about the same width as the cave entrance. To keep from ripping the fenders off George Barris' creation, they undercranked the cameras so it could come out slowly and then later speed up the film to give the illusion of speed.
 In most scenes of the villains hideouts, the camera is shot at a Dutch angle. If the camera is crooked and Batman is in shot, the chances are that something bad will soon happen to him, as is the case in the Go-Go Bar scene of the first episode of this adventure.
 The Batmobile's ever-popular Emergency Bat-Turn Lever is put into use for the first time in this episode.
 For the 1966 Emmys, Batman was nominated as Outstanding Comedy Series while Frank Gorshin was nominated for Outstanding Performance by an Actor in a Supporting Role in a Comedy ("Hi Diddle Riddle"). A third nomination was made for editing.
 Lyle Waggoner was second choice for the role of Batman and filmed for a test reel. Waggoner later on played Major Steve Leonard Trevor on Wonder Woman.
 This is one of three episodes of Batman in which characters die; the second is Episode #8705-Pt. 2, "A Death Worse Than Fate", wherein the gunmen, intending to drill Batman and Robin full of bullets, shoot each other to death as the Dynamic Duo dodge them, aided by Zelda The Great (Anne Baxter). In "Instant Freeze" a butler {John Zaremba} is frozen and shatters into pieces. Ambiguous episodes are "Green Ice" in which a policeman is frozen solid; in "The Penguin's Nest" a policeman is shocked; in "The Bookworm Turns" a henchman of The Bookworm — disguised to look like Commissioner Gordon — is shot and falls off a bridge. This is the only episode in which a female character unambiguously dies (Catwoman appears to die several times, but survives).
 The Riddler's maniacal high-pitched giggle was inspired by the character Tommy Udo (portrayed by Richard Widmark) in the 1947 20th Century-Fox crime film-noir Kiss of Death.
 During the chase scene where Batman is racing from the Batcave to save Robin, one very brief clip of the Batmobile passing by on the road shows the car's original paint scheme; matte black with white striping. This is the only footage of the car with this early paint scheme that appears in the series, although several black and white stills showing the car in this form exist.

References

External links
 

1966 American television episodes
Batman (TV series) episodes